Cacophony was an American heavy metal band formed in 1986 by guitarists Marty Friedman and Jason Becker, and signed to Shrapnel Records. They released two studio albums and remained active until 1989, after which both guitarists forged their own solo careers and joined other bands.

History
The two albums released by Cacophony, Speed Metal Symphony (1987) and Go Off! (1988), were showpieces of the kind of highly technical playing typical of the 1980s shred era, with songs featuring fast tempos, melodic solos, exotic neoclassical scales and dual guitar harmonizations. Several of the tracks were entirely instrumental, which prominently demonstrated Friedman and Becker's renowned technical skills. In a 2009 article by Guitar World magazine, Speed Metal Symphony was ranked ninth in a list of all-time top ten shred albums.

Both Friedman and Becker released their own solo albums—Dragon's Kiss and Perpetual Burn, respectively—in 1988, before the release of Go Off! Friedman later joined the thrash metal band Megadeth in 1990, remaining with them for nine years as well as releasing several more solo albums, while Becker enjoyed a short stint in David Lee Roth's solo band from 1989 to 1991. Becker's time with Roth was abruptly cut short due to an onset of amyotrophic lateral sclerosis, a degenerative disease that rendered him completely unable to play and, soon afterwards, move or speak.

Band members
Peter Marrino – vocals
Dan Bryant – vocals (last tour only)
Marty Friedman – guitar
Jason Becker – guitar
Atma Anur – drums
Deen Castronovo – drums
Kenny Stavropoulos – drums (live only)
Jimmy O'Shea – bass, backing vocals
Craig Swain – bass, backing vocals (live only)

Discography
1987: Speed Metal Symphony
1988: Go Off!

References

External links
Shrapnel Records official website

Musical groups established in 1986
Musical groups disestablished in 1989
Heavy metal musical groups from California
1986 establishments in California
Shrapnel Records artists